John Pai (born 1937) is a Korean-American sculptor and Pratt Institute Professor Emeritus. He was the youngest professor at Pratt to be appointed to faculty.

Pai was born in Seoul, South Korea in 1937. His father was a Presbyterian minister. He had 2 siblings and was the youngest. He immigrated with his family to the United States in 1949. Pai spent his teen years in Wheeling, West Virginia. In 1952, he had his first solo show at the Oglebay Institute in Wheeling, West Virginia. Pai was a student of artist Harry C. Holbert while at the Oglebay Institute.  

In 1958, Pai got a full scholarship to the Pratt Institute, where he graduated with Bachelors in industrial design in 1962. In 1964, Pai earned a Master in Fine Arts in sculpture from Pratt.  At Pratt, he studied under Dr. Rowena Reed Kostellow. For his sculptures, Pai welded steel rods together, often in grid-like patterns, in order to create 3D shapes in space. Pai became the chair of Pratt’s undergraduate sculpture program in 1965.  

Pai's work was featured in the 2003 Smithsonian International Gallery's group show of recent Korean American art. In 2013, Pai had a solo exhibbition titled "In Memory's Lair" in Gallery Hyundai in Seoul. From November 18, 2021 to January 29, 2022, Pai's work was exhibited alongside the work of Leo Amino and Minoru Niizuma in Chelsea’s Tina Kim Gallery in a groundbreaking exhibit called the "The Unseen Professors," which highlighted Asian American sculptors who worked in New York City during the 1960s and 1970s. 

In 2021, Pai was awarded the Rowena Reed Award. An untitled sculpture of Pai's from 1963 is featured in the Los Angeles County Museum of Art  exhibit "The Space Between: The Modern in Korean Art" which runs from September 11, 2022 to February 19, 2023.

Resources

External Links 
 Artist Interview with Gallery Hyundai
 "The Other Side of Steel: The Sculpture of John Pai" - Lecture on Pai's work by Rutger's Professor Dr. John Yau

1937 births
Pratt Institute alumni
Pratt Institute faculty
American people of Korean descent
American sculptors
Immigrants to the United States
Living people
People from Seoul
Artists from Seoul